Fortitude Valley railway station is located on the North Coast line in Queensland, Australia. Located beneath the Valley Metro complex, it serves the central Brisbane suburb of Fortitude Valley. The station is one of four inner city stations that form a core corridor through the centre of Brisbane.

Pedestrian access to the station is via two thoroughfares near the corner of Brunswick and Wickham Streets and a pedestrian overpass connecting to McWhirters. There is also a lesser known entrance through the car park at the Northern side of the station, both out to Alfred Street in the West and Alden Street in the east, the latter through a secluded elevator in the eastern side of the car parking complex.

On the Path to the overpass to McWhirters, exists two escalators that lead down to Wickham Street, however due to political issues these escalators are non-functional and are normally closed off with a metal door.

History
The station opened on 1 November 1890 as Brunswick Street with the completion of the railway from Brisbane Central.

In July 2007, an upgrade on the station commenced but being a busy station, only two platforms were able to be upgraded at any one time.

The upgrade was completed in October 2008 with escalators, elevators, new lighting, updated passenger information displays and upgraded flooring. With the upgrade completed, the station was renamed Fortitude Valley.

An upgrade of the Valley Metro Shopping centre (building that exists around the station) commenced in 2017 and has the potential to upgrade the entrances to the station.

Services
Fortitude Valley station is served by all suburban and interurban City network lines. Also see Inner City timetable

Services by platform

References

External links

Fortitude Valley station Queensland Rail
Fortitude Valley station Queensland's Railways on the Internet

Railway stations in Brisbane
Railway stations in Australia opened in 1890
North Coast railway line, Queensland